A chairman of the board (or chair, chairperson, or chairwoman) is a seat of office in an organization, especially of corporations.

Chairman of the board may also refer to:

 Chairman of the Board (film), a 1998 film
 Chairmen of the Board, a 1970s American soul music group
 The Chairmen of the Board (album), their debut album
 Chairman of the Board (album), a 1959 album by Count Basie
Chairmen of the Bored, 2008 crunk album by Lord T & Eloise
 Chairman of the Board (single), a 2000 single by Australia band Motor Ace

Nicknames 
 Frank Sinatra (1915–1998), frequently referred to as "The Chairman of the Board" (of Reprise Records)
 Whitey Ford (1928–2020), nicknamed "Chairman of the Board"
 Eamonn Coghlan (born 1952), nicknamed "Chairman of the Boards" (note the plural) because of his prowess in the indoor mile run
 Moses Malone (1955–2015), occasionally referred to as "The Chairman of the Boards" for his on-court dominance and rebounding prowess during his tenure in the NBA
 David Miscavige (born 1960), frequently referred to by Scientologists as "Chairman of the Board" (or "COB"), his official title, rather than by name
 Page McConnell (born 1963), frequently referred to as "Chairman of the Boards"
 Vince McMahon (born 1945), frequently introduced as "The Chairman of the Board"